Soudek is a surname. Notable people with the surname include:

Ernst Soudek (born 1940), Austrian discus thrower
Robin Soudek (born 1991), Czech ice hockey player

See also
Saudek